Foyle's War is a British detective drama television series set during and shortly after the Second World War, created by Midsomer Murders screenwriter and author Anthony Horowitz and commissioned by ITV after the long-running series Inspector Morse ended in 2000. It began broadcasting on ITV in October 2002. ITV director of programmes Simon Shaps cancelled Foyle's War in 2007, but Peter Fincham (Shaps' replacement) revived the programme after good ratings for 2008's fifth series. The final episode was broadcast on 18 January 2015, after eight series.

Description
Detective Chief Superintendent Christopher Foyle (Michael Kitchen), a widower, is quiet, methodical, sagacious, scrupulously honest and frequently underestimated by his foes. Many of his cases concern profiteering, the black market and murder, and he is often called on to catch criminals who are taking advantage of the confusion created by the war. Although Foyle often comes up against high-ranking officials in the British military or intelligence services who would prefer that he mind his own business, he seeks justice tenaciously. Throughout the series, he is assisted by his driver, Samantha "Sam" Stewart (Honeysuckle Weeks), and Detective Sergeant Paul Milner (Anthony Howell).

The first six series are set during the Second World War in Hastings, Sussex, England, and in series seven, Foyle works after retirement for MI5 on Cold War espionage. The stories are largely self-contained. There are some running plot strands, primarily involving the career of Foyle's son Andrew Foyle (Julian Ovenden) – a fighter pilot in the Royal Air Force – or Foyle's relationships with minor characters. Each episode runs for 90 to 100 minutes, filling a two-hour time slot on ITV when commercials are included.

Production
In a newspaper article and an interview accompanying the series-one DVD set, Horowitz explained that he was seeking a name which evoked the early 1940s. He thought of Foyles bookshop in London's Charing Cross Road, once known for its archaic business practices and its owner, Christina Foyle; Christopher was the nearest male name to Christina. After Christina Foyle's death, control of Foyles passed in 1999 to her nephew Christopher. Christopher Foyle made a cameo appearance in the episode "Bad Blood", although his scene was cut from PBS airings in the US.

The series is also notable for its attention to historical detail, and the drama is frequently moved along by historical events of the Second World War. Horowitz considered that to honour the veterans of the war it was important to get the details correct. As the series progressed, he became more interested in the "murder mystery" format than the portrayal of history and exploration of the Home Front. Nevertheless, the Imperial War Museum is credited in an advisory capacity in some episodes.

St Just, in Croft Road, Hastings, was used as the location for Foyle's home.

Cancellation and revival
After five series, Foyle's War was cancelled abruptly by ITV director of programmes Simon Shaps. This forced Horowitz to discard scripts set during most of 1943 and 1944, resulting in time jumps of nine months to a year between episodes; previous series had gaps of a month at most. In April 2008, the presumed final episode, "All Clear" (during which the end of the war is announced) was broadcast.

On 9 April 2008, however, ITV announced that it was negotiating with Horowitz and Greenlit Productions to revive the series and continue Foyle's adventures beyond VE Day; some media observers saw high viewing figures for the penultimate episode (a 28-percent audience share) on 13 April as strengthening the case for continuing. When the audience figures for the final episode were released (28 percent and an average of 7.3 million viewers), ITV confirmed that it had entered "early discussions" with Horowitz and Greenlit. The negotiations led to Foyle's War recommissioning for an additional three series. Series six began filming in February 2009 and premiered on UK television on 11 April 2010. Series seven was filmed in Ireland and London from late August to December 2012, and was broadcast in the UK in March and April 2013. Series eight, three two-hour episodes, aired in the UK in January 2015.

Episodes

Episode numbers in parentheses are a running count used in the following table, "Main Characters".

Main characters

Christopher Foyle
Detective Chief Superintendent (DCS) Foyle introduces himself with the phrase (or some variation thereof), "My name's Foyle; I'm a police officer", typical of the modesty, courtesy and precision of speech he exhibits throughout the series. Foyle is a widower of long standing; he has one son, Andrew, with whom he is close (although their relationship is undemonstrative). Foyle's concern for Andrew's safety as a fighter pilot in the RAF is a recurring theme. His wife, Rosalind, died in 1932; according to her tombstone, she was 29 years old.

Foyle is the son of a policeman. A World War I veteran who fought at Passchendaele, he once told Andrew that his three years of military service were the worst of his life and reluctantly admitted killing enemy soldiers. Foyle requests a transfer to the War Office several times in the first two series, but by the end of the third series he seems to have accepted his lot; his detective work is just as important, in its own way, to the war effort. He argues that innocent victims of murder should not be forgotten during wartime.

With high moral standards, Foyle is scrupulously honest and incisive. His speech is straightforward, and peppered with dry wit. Foyle is open-minded for a man of his time. He is compassionate when he learns that one of Andrew's friends is homosexual ("Among the Few") and reluctant to prosecute an attempted suicide ("Casualties of War"); homosexual activity and attempted suicide were criminal offences at the time. Foyle is also reluctant to harass a left-wing activist for his political views ("War of Nerves"). He alone opposes the imposition of a temporary colour bar in Hastings when tensions erupt between black and white US troops ("Killing Time"). Consistent with the value he places on human life, Foyle notes that the accidental killing of a pregnant woman took two lives ("Among the Few").

Loyal to his colleagues, he expects the same from them; he reproaches Sgt. Milner for disloyalty in "The White Feather" and criticises the sergeant's disrespectful attitude towards him and Stewart in "The Russian House", despite the fact that they no longer work together. In turn, Foyle trusts his colleagues. Quick to forgive Milner, he believes in the sergeant's innocence when he is suspected of his estranged wife's murder in "Bleak Midwinter". Foyle has a fatherly concern (mixed with exasperation) for Stewart.

He relaxes by trout fishing (at which he is very skilled and which supplements his wartime rations), and plays golf with less proficiency. Foyle is often accompanied in both by his son or Hugh Reid, his uniformed counterpart. Cameo and guest characters also occasionally appear with him on these outings, enabling exchanges of information important to the plot.

Foyle retires (or resigns) more than once, resigning at the end of the fourth series when his arrest of two murder suspects is thwarted by a bureaucrat with the claim that their work is too important to the war effort. He returns in the fifth series when his successor is murdered, and remains a DCS for the duration of the war. Foyle retires from the force after the war, returning when he becomes involved in a complex case investigated by Milner. At the end of the sixth series he retires again, boarding a ship bound for the US (possibly pursuing unfinished business, left for political reasons until after the war - from the episode "Fifty Ships"). Foyle returns to England at the beginning of the seventh series and is pressured into joining MI5, where Stewart (now married to a Labour politician) joins him as a junior clerk.

Paul Milner
Sergeant Milner, a policeman before the war, left the force to enlist in the army. Involved in the Norwegian Campaign, he lost a leg at Trondheim. In episode one, he is recovering in hospital and despondent. Foyle encourages him to rejoin the police, and Milner remains with the Hastings department for the duration of the war. Milner is the only ranked detective in the station other than Foyle. In "The White Feather", he is impressed by a charismatic fascist politician which clouds his judgment when the politician is involved in a murder investigation. When Foyle reproaches him for disloyalty, Milner says that the politician was the only person who did not treat him like a war casualty. The politician used Milner to smuggle an important stolen document; the sergeant offers his resignation (which Foyle does not accept). After Foyle's resignation at the end of series five, Milner (dissatisfied with his new superior) considers requesting a transfer but changes his mind when Foyle comes out of retirement to investigate the new DCS's murder.

Milner's relationship with his wife Jane is increasingly strained, and she never fully comes to terms with his injury. After a long separation (during which Milner begins a relationship with Edith Ashford), Jane returns from her family home in Wales ("Bleak Midwinter") to reconcile and is murdered. In a conversation just before Jane's death, Milner lies to Edith that he is divorced from Jane. In the intended final episode, "All Clear", Edith gives birth to their daughter Clementine (named after Clementine Churchill, the prime minister's wife).

At the beginning of Series six, Milner has been promoted to Detective Inspector in the Brighton area. While investigating his first case (which involves Foyle and Stewart) he is insecure in his new position and abrupt and dismissive towards his old colleagues (earning him an unusually-sharp reproach from Foyle by the end of the case).

Samantha Stewart
Sam Stewart joins the Mechanised Transport Corps at the outbreak of the war. She is seconded to the police force as a driver in the first episode to relieve staff shortages in the police force, and becomes Foyle's driver. She is enthusiastic about police work, offering unsolicited advice and help to Foyle and Milner despite instructions not to discuss police work. But they come to rely on her assistance more and more. In "Plan of Attack", Stewart had left the police service soon after Foyle's resignation but returns as his driver when he rejoins the force. She has a healthy appetite and her struggles with rationing are a recurring, humorous theme. She invites herself to eat with Foyle several times, and covets a turkey (kept for evidence) in "Bleak Midwinter".

Stewart's father and several uncles are Church of England vicars. Her father, the Rev. Iain Stewart, visits her in Hastings ("Eagle Day"). Although he wants her to return home to Lyminster, he realises that her work for the police is important after discussions with Foyle. His artistic background also helps Milner solve a crime, which may have contributed to his decision. Stewart stays with her uncle, the Rev. Aubrey Stewart, at his vicarage in Levenham in "The French Drop" and Foyle houses him for an ecumenical conference near Hastings in "Plan of Attack". In that episode, she says that all her uncles are vicars.

She becomes friendly with Andrew Foyle and, eventually, involved romantically. They try to keep their relationship from his father, fearing his disapproval. Stewart supports Andrew when he experiences shell shock in "Enemy Fire", but their relationship ends when he sends her a "Dear Jane letter" in "Invasion". She becomes fond of American private Joe Farnetti, but refuses his marriage proposal. The relationship continued after D-Day, since she complains in "Broken Souls" that he "ran off with some French girl". Andrew returns in "All Clear", asks Stewart to forgive him and they celebrate VE day. Series six begins in June 1945, with Stewart a housekeeper for a wealthy artist; her sense of purpose is apparently gone. Later in the sixth series, Stewart has a new love interest: Adam Wainwright, a former Bletchley Park codebreaker who proposes to her in that series' final episode. By series seven they are married, and in series eight are expecting their first child.

Her capabilities develop during the series. At the start, she is a competent driver anxious to help where she can (with surprise interjections from her auto-mechanic and emergency medical training in the Mechanised Transport Corps). She picks up investigative techniques from Foyle and Milner over the years, with occasional mistakes in applying them (e.g. Series 7: Sunflower). However, by Series 8 (High Castle) Foyle is happy to leave her as lead in an interrogation and MI5 is OK with her going undercover for them.

Andrew Foyle
Squadron Leader Andrew Foyle DFC, RAFVR is Christopher Foyle's only child. At the outbreak of the war he was a student, and joined the RAF in "The German Woman". After undergoing training as a fighter pilot in Scotland, he is posted to the south coast and is involved in radar trials ("Eagle Day"). He sees action in the Battle of Britain. In "Enemy Fire", experiencing combat fatigue stemming from near-constant flying and grief at the loss of many friends, he briefly goes AWOL. His superior, Wing Commander Turner (Martin Turner), is understanding and transfers him to a training unit.

Andrew has a girlfriend in "Among the Few", but the relationship does not last. He becomes involved with Stewart until he is posted to Debden as a training officer in "Enemy Fire" (his penultimate on-screen appearance). Soon after his posting, he ends his relationship with Stewart by letter (read in voice-over in "Invasion") after beginning a short-lived relationship with another woman. Promoted to squadron leader and posted to Malta on active service, he is demobilised and sent home after a serious bout of sinusitis ruins his eyesight. He is then an unseen character, referred to only in dialogue and props, until his return to Hastings during the intended last episode ("All Clear"). Apologising to Stewart for his poor treatment of her, he tries to resume their relationship as "friends". Although she seems to be thawing towards him by the end of the episode, in the following series he is replaced as her love interest by Adam Wainwright. Andrew is mentioned as living in London during the seventh series, but is not mentioned when his father visits London and leaves for America. In the eighth series, he is working in the City.

International broadcast
 Africa - The series began broadcasting in 2009 on the pay service DStv (broadcast from South Africa) on the Universal Channel.
 Australia - Aired on the ABC, with repeats on Seven Network
 Canada - Broadcast in Ontario on TV Ontario and in British Columbia on Knowledge Network
 Finland - Broadcast on YLE1; series seven and eight broadcast in 2015-2016
 Sweden - Broadcast on TV8.se, SVT and TV4
 US - Aired on PBS. Series 1-8 are available for streaming on Acorn TV and occasionally on Netflix (the latest run in 2014–2017) via paid subscription. Acorn Media contracted Cre-a-TV to repackage Foyle's War in two-part episodes to run in PBS' time slots. The episodes were fed by satellite to the public-television system by former PBS affiliate KCET in Los Angeles (now an independent station), and public TV stations began rebroadcasting the series in the fall of 2011. Each episode was aired in two parts, each in a one-hour time slot (usually separated by a week), and each part ran about 50 minutes.

Awards
Foyle's War was nominated in the Best Production Design category for the 2003 BAFTA Television Awards, and won a Lew Grade Award for Best Entertainment Programme that year. The series was nominated for the 2004 BAFTA Best Drama Series award. That year, Honeysuckle Weeks was nominated for the 10th National Television Awards' Most Popular Newcomer award.

Media

DVD releases
In the UK, the first four series of Foyle's War were released as two two-disc DVDs per series, with two episodes each and episode titles instead of series numbers. In March 2007, UK and US distributor Acorn Media began re-releasing series 1–3 as four-disc DVDs for the UK (as they had in the US) and labelling them with series numbers. A complete box set of the series is available.

Blu-ray releases
All but the last two series have been released on Blu-ray in Australia (all discs are region-free). While it may appear the "complete collection" box set includes seven seasons, there are only the first six series included. This is due to Icon entertainment releasing parts 1 & 2 of series four as seasons 4 & 5 respectively. Hence after the fourth season the Australian season numbering is one greater than the series that is included in the release.

Other Media releases
Hastings Borough Council and Rod Green have produced books to accompany the popular series and these go behind the scenes, as well as celebrate aspects of the series. Notable authors on the town during this period and who are acknowledged in these books as offering further information are Nathan Dylan Goodwin, Victoria Seymour and Mary Haskell Porter.

 Foyle's Hastings, Hastings Borough Council, 2006 (No ISBN available)
 Foyle's Hastings, Hastings Borough Council, 2006 (updated version), 
 The Real History Behind Foyle's War, Green, R., (2nd Ed.), 2010,

Notes

References

External links
 
 Foyleswar.com The official fan website
 Foyle's War Forum 
 

2002 British television series debuts
2015 British television series endings
2000s British crime television series
2010s British crime television series
2000s British drama television series
2010s British drama television series
British detective television series
English-language television shows
Hastings
ITV mystery shows
MI5 in fiction
Television shows written by Anthony Horowitz
Television series by Sony Pictures Television
Television series produced at Pinewood Studios
British television series revived after cancellation
Television series set in the 1940s
World War II television drama series
Television shows shot in Liverpool